James "Jimmy" Brown MBE (24 September 1931 – 8 December 2014) was a Scottish first-class cricketer. He played as a wicket-keeper and took a record 119 catches and 40 stumpings for them. In first-class cricket his tally of 105 dismissals is easily the most by a cricketer for Scotland.

In club cricket for Perthshire and took 674 dismissals. He was awarded the MBE in the 1974 New Year Honours.

He died on 8 December 2014 at the age of 83.

References

External links
Cricket Europe

1931 births
2014 deaths
Cricketers from Perth, Scotland
Gentlemen cricketers
Members of the Order of the British Empire
Scottish cricket captains
Scottish cricketers
Wicket-keepers